The Tranent to Cockenzie Waggonway was an early waggonway, possibly the first in Scotland, opened in 1722. It was  miles long and connected coal pits at Tranent with the salt pans at Cockenzie and harbour at Port Seton in East Lothian,  Scotland. The track was wooden, and wagons were drawn by horses. The Battle of Prestonpans in 1745 was fought across the line.

It was converted to use iron rails in 1815, and was connected to the new main line North British Railway from 1846, later becoming superseded by a branch line of that railway. A section of the original line of route was still in railway use until 1968. Some of the route can be traced at the present day.

History

Before the eighteenth century, salt production on the shore of the Firth of Forth was a considerable activity; salt water was evaporated in salt pans. This required considerable quantities of coal, and this formed the largest demand for coal at this early date. While at the earliest date, it was possible to extract coal close to the salt pans, these deposits were soon worked out and coal had to be transported in from a more remote location.

The landowner, the Earl of Winton, supported the Old Pretender in the Jacobite Rebellion of 1715 and as a result his estates were forfeit to the Crown. They were later acquired by the York Buildings Company of London, in 1719. Following a series of financial speculations, the Company became the largest in Scotland, but (because of the difficulty of communication in those days) it found it difficult to manage its business. It resolved the problem by leasing local businesses to tenants, providing incentives for them to improve their holdings.

This resulted in improvements taking place at Port Seton harbour. The waggonway connected the harbour to salt pans at Cockenzie and the coal pits at Tranent. The cost of all the works was £3,500, completed in 1722. This original wooden railway followed a route along what is now School Lane in Cockenzie, before heading eastwards along the High Street to Port Seton Harbour.  Photographs of the waggons used (circa 1854) have been discovered at Cockenzie House, showing waggonway similar to Shropshire design being used. 

The railway used small wagons in short trains, and with the smaller track gauge this indicates the influence of Shropshire waggonway designs.

The installation was let to William Adam for £1,000 per annum. The rent was halved in 1733, reflecting Adam's lack of success in making a profit. He was unable to continue even at this lower rent, and he gave up the lease. Other tenants tried their hand, also without success.

In 1745 the railway was the scene of part of the Battle of Prestonpans, during the Jacobite rising of 1745. The forces of Charles Edward Stuart, Bonnie Prince Charlie were advancing southwards, and the opposing forces of Sir John Cope brought them to battle. On 20 September 1745 Cope's troops and artillery ranged along the waggonway. Dendy Marshall says that they used an embankment formed for the railway as cover. Bonnie Prince Charlie cut through Cope's forces, and put them to flight.

The York Buildings Company was sequestered in 1777, and in 1779 the former Winton estate was sold to the Cadell family.

The offer for sale declared that: "There is still an extensive field of coal, whereof no part has hitherto been wrought by fire engine or other proper machinery. The whole of the coal lies at a small distance from the sea. The port and harbour of Seaton make part of the estate to be sold; and there is a waggon-way from the coal-pits to the salt-pans and the shore."

It was stipulated that: "The waggon-way is to be communicated to the purchasers in Lots 2d [2nd] and 3d [3rd] of Tranent, and a liberty reserved, on paying damages, to carry the waggon-way through the links of Seaton to the harbour of Port-Seaton, in the direction it formerly went, when the coal was wrought for the Company's account."

Worling concludes: "Obviously, the lower part of the waggonway, as originally built, had been allowed to fall into disuse by the tenant... Clearly, in these early times, horses were used to haul the waggons. It may be that gravity was used in the downward direction, as happened later, but it is impossible to ascertain how free running the crude vehicles were. Even allowing for intervening changes in the landscape, an inspection of the route today reveals that the gradient on some parts of the route is slight, and in one place is even uphill against the general lie of the land (around Meadowhill)."

Robertson's earlier view is not entirely the same: "The line was built to give a steady downhill gradient to the sea, even though this required the construction of a substantial embankment, so that loaded trains of waggons could be sent down by gravity under the control of a brakesman, and horses would only be required for returning the empties."

The line was single, with two passing places.

Conversion to edge rails

In 1815 the wooden track system was altered to use cast iron fish bellied edge rails, retaining a single line with passing places. Alexander Scott described it in 1824:

Mr Cadell's waggons travel from his coal-works, in Tranent Moor, to Cockenzie, a distance of upwards of 4,480 yards, on a cast-iron railway, that has various declivities and circular turns; and require only the assistance of a man, in the downward journey, to attend to the several brakes attached to the waggons. The breadth of the horse-track is 3 feet 3 inches; the waggons, when loaded, including their carriages, are each about 2 tons. A horse sometimes takes up 5 empty waggons, but the common number is 4, and these he commonly drags three times a day.

In 1833 Cockenzie Harbour was substantially reconstructed by the civil engineer Robert Stevenson. At about this time the waggonway was extended southwards to coal pits at Windygoul.

In 1844 the North British Railway was authorised to build its main line from Edinburgh to Berwick. This opened in 1846, and it intersected the route of the waggon-way, which was provided with a bridge to carry it over the new line.

Main line connection
Also in 1846 the North British Railway secured an Act of Parliament authorising a branch from its main line at Bankton, a little to the west, to Tranent and Windygoul; the branch line opened in 1849. The line was relaid with wrought iron rails, probably in the 1850s.

Cadell was able to take advantage of the construction of the main line railway, as it enabled his coal to be transported more cheaply; he arranged for transshipment sidings at both Meadowmill and at Windygoul. The track gauge of his waggonway prevented through running, and obviously a direct connection from the North British Railway was considerably superior. Transport of the coal by coastal shipping from Cockenzie Harbour naturally declined, and the lower part of the waggonway, north of the Meadowmill connection with the NBR, soon became disused and was later dismantled. The upper part continued to flourish, however, and for another 30 years it carried the Tranent coal down to the main line railway.

About 1880 the coal merchant James Waldie took over the lease of the Tranent collieries and the waggonway. The waggonway was rebuilt as a standard-gauge railway with steam locomotives, and a junction was made with the North British Railway at Meadowmill. At this period Cockenzie Harbour was no longer much used due to the larger vessels then in use being unable to berth there, but for a period an exchange siding was made at Meadowmill, and the waggonway wagons were tipped into main line wagons for onward transport, generally to Leith.

Twenty years later James Waldie and the other leading East Lothian coalmasters combined to form the Edinburgh Collieries Co. Ltd. The railway branch line, partly on the alignment of the earlier waggonway, was extended to Fleets Colliery. (Dott dates the "final uprooting" of the original line to "about 1896". The usage as a modern railway continued until the closure of Fleets Colliery in 1959.

Above Meadowmill, a section of the original waggonway was subsequently used as a storage siding for National Coal Board coal wagons in the 1960s; this part of the route had therefore been in railway use for about 240 years.

The present day

The alignment of the original waggonway can still be discerned in places. Part of its length is used as a public path by walkers, cyclists, and horse-riders.

There is a residential street in Tranent called The Waggonway (EH33 2QY). This is not on the line of the Tranent and Cockenzie line, but is near to the Windygoul pit on the extension.

At Cockenzie Harbour, in situ stone sleeper blocks and a turntable cavity & loading bay were discovered in 2017/2018, and further discoveries made in 2019, by the 1722 Waggonway Heritage Group, formed in 2017 to preserve and promote the route as a heritage asset. A mobile app, interpretation boards and way-marked signage are available to inform and educate walkers.

Notes

References

See also
Haytor Granite Tramway

External links
 www.1722waggonway.co.uk Official web site of the 1722 Waggonway Heritage Group and its museum
 Battle of Prestonpans 1745 Heritage Trust – newspaper clippings of historic photographs of the waggonway
 1722 Waggonway Project Videos
 Canmore ID 55012 on Canmore website

Early Scottish railway companies
Pre-grouping British railway companies
Closed railway lines in Scotland
Minor British railway companies
History of East Lothian
Railway lines opened in 1722
1722 establishments in Scotland
Transport in East Lothian
Horse-drawn railways